Cook Islands Māori is an Eastern Polynesian language that is the official language of the Cook Islands. Cook Islands Māori is closely related to New Zealand Māori, but is a distinct language in its own right. Cook Islands Māori is simply called Māori when there is no need to disambiguate it from New Zealand Māori, but it is also known as Māori Kūki Āirani (or Maori Kuki Airani) or controversially Rarotongan. Many Cook Islanders also call it Te reo Ipukarea, literally "the language of the Ancestral Homeland".

Official status
Cook Islands Māori became an official language of the Cook Islands in 2003; from 1915 until then, English had been the only official language of the Cook Islands.

Te Reo Maori Act definition 
The Te Reo Maori Act 2003 states that Māori: 

Pukapukan is considered by scholars and speakers alike to be a distinct language more closely related to Sāmoan and Tokelauan than Cook Islands Māori. It belongs to the Samoic subgroup of the Polynesian language family.  The intention behind including Pukapukan in the definition of Te Reo Maori was to ensure its protection.

The dialects of the East Polynesian varieties of the Cook Islands (collectively referred to as Cook Islands Māori) are:
 Rakahanga-Manihiki 
 Penrhyn (Tongarevan or Mangarongaro);
 Southern: Rarotongan, Ngā Pū Toru (the dialects of Atiu, Mitiaro and Mauke), Aitutaki, Mangaia.

Cook Islands Māori is closely related to Tahitian and New Zealand Māori, and there is a degree of mutual intelligibility with both of these  languages.

The language is theoretically regulated by the Kopapa Reo created in 2003, but this organisation is currently dormant.

Writing system and pronunciation
There is a debate about the standardisation of the writing system. Although the usage of the macron (־) te makarona and the glottal stop amata is recommended, most speakers do not use the two diacritics in everyday writing. The Cook Islands Māori Revised New Testament uses a standardised orthography (spelling system) that includes the diacritics when they are phonemic but not elsewhere.

Consonants 

 Present only in Manihiki
 Present only in Penrhyn
 Present only in Manihiki and Penrhyn

Vowels

Grammar 
Cook Islands Māori is an isolating language with very little morphology. Case is marked by the particle that initiates a noun phrase, and like most East Polynesian languages, Cook Islands Māori has nominative-accusative case marking.

The unmarked constituent order is predicate initial: that is, verb initial in verbal sentences and nominal-predicate initial in non-verbal sentences.

Personal pronouns 

you -2 or more- and I
they and I

Tense-Aspect-Mood markers 
{| class="wikitable"
! Marker
! Aspect
! Examples
|-
! Tē... nei
| present continuous
|
Tē manako nei au i te oki ki te are : I am thinking of going back to the house 
Tē kata nei rātou : They are laughing 
Kāre au e tanu nei i te pia : I'm not planting any arrowroot
|-
! Kia
| Mildly imperative or exhortatory, expressing a desire, a wish rather than a strong command.
|
Kia vave mai! : be quick ! (don't be long!) 
Kia viviki mai! : be quick (don't dawdle!) 
Kia manuia! : good luck! 
Kia rave ana koe i tēnā angaanga  :  would you do that job 
Kia tae mai ki te angaanga ā te pōpongi Mōnitē :  come to work on Monday morning 
Teia te tātāpaka, kia kai koe :  Here's the breadfruit pudding, eat up
|-
! e
|Imperative, order
|
e eke  koe ki raro :  you get down 
e tū ki kō : stand over there
|-
! Auraka
| interdiction, don't
|
Auraka rava koe e āmiri i tēia niuniu ora, ka utiutiia koe :  don't on any account  touch this live wire, you'll get a shock
|-
! kāre
| indicate the negation, not, nothing, nowhere
|
Kāre nō te ua : It will not rain 
Kāre a Tī tuatua : Tī doesn't have anything to say
|-
! e… ana
| habitual action or state
|E aere ana koe ki te ura :  Do you go to the dance? E noo ana aia ki  Nikao i tē reira tuātau :  he used to live in Nikao at that time
|-
! Ka
| Refers prospectively to the commencement of an action or state. Often translatable as the English future tense or "going to" construction
|Ka imene a Mere  ākonei ite pō :  Mary is going to sing later on tonight Kua kite au ē ka riri a Tere :  I know (or knew) that Tere will (or would) be angry
|-
! Kua
| translatable as the English simple past or present tense (with adjectives)
|Kua kite mai koe ia mātou : You saw us Kua meitaki koe ? :  Are you better now? Kua oti te tārekareka : the match is over now
|}
Most of the preceding examples were taken from Cook Islands Maori Dictionary, by Jasper Buse with Raututi Taringa edited by Bruce Biggs and Rangi Moekaa, Auckland, 1995.

 Possessives 
Like most other Polynesian languages (Tahitian, New Zealand Māori, Hawaiian, Samoan, Tongan ...), Cook Islands Māori has two categories of possessives, "a" and "o".

Generally, the "a" category is used when the possessor has or had control over the initiation of the possessive relationship. Usually this means that the possessor  is superior or dominant to what is owned, or that the possession is considered as alienable. The "o" category is used when the possessor has or had no control over the initiation of the relationship. This usually means that the possessor is subordinate or inferior to what is owned, or that the possession is considered to be inalienable.

The following list indicates the types of things in the different categories:

 a is used in speaking of
 Movable property, instruments,
 Food and drink,
 Husband, wife, children, grandchildren, girlfriend, boyfriend,
 Animals and pets, (except for horses)
 People in an inferior position

 Te puaka a tērā vaine :  the pig belonging to that woman;
 ā Tere tamariki :  Tere's children;
 Kāre ā Tupe mā ika inapō : Tupe  and the rest didn't get any fish last night

 Tāku ; Tāau ; Tāna ;  Tā tāua ;  Tā māua…. : my, mine ; your, yours ; his, her, hers, our ours…

 Ko tāku vaine tēia :  This is my wife;
 Ko tāna tāne tērā :  That's her husband;
 Tā kotou apinga : your possession(s);
 Tā Tare apinga :  Tērā possession(s);

 o is used in speaking of
 Parts of anything
 Feelings
 Buildings and transport (including horses)
 Clothes
 Parents or other relatives (not husband, wife, children…)
 Superiors

 Te are o Tere :  The house belonging to Tere;
 ō Tere pare : Tere's hat;
 Kāre ō Tina noo anga e noo ei :  Tina hasn't got anywhere to sit;

 Tōku ;  Tōou ; Tōna ; Tō tāua ;  Tō māua…: my, mine  ;  your, yours ; his, her, hers ; our, ours …

 Ko tōku are tēia : This is my  house;
 I tōku manako, ka tika tāna :  In my opinion, he'll be right;
 Tēia tōku, tērā tōou : This is mine here, that's yours over there

 Vocabulary 

Pia : Polynesian arrowroot

Kata :  laugh at; laughter; kata āviri :  ridicule, jeer, mock

Tanu :  to plant, cultivate land

angaanga : work, job

Pōpongi : morning

Tātāpaka :  a kind of breadfruit pudding

ura : dance, to dance

Tuātau : time, period, season ; ē tuātau ua atu :  forever

īmene :  to sing, song

Riri :  be angry with (ki)

Tārekareka :  entertain, amuse, match, game, play game

 Dialectology 

Although most words of the various dialects of Cook Islands Māori  are identical, there are some differences:

Demographics

Notes

 Sources  

 Cook Islands Maori Database Project, An online project created to build a collection of Cook Islands Maori Words based on existing print dictionaries and other sources. 
 Cook Islands Maori Dictionary, by Jasper Buse with Raututi Taringa, edited by Bruce Biggs and Rangi Moekaa, Auckland, 1995.
 A dictionary of the Maori Language of Rarotonga, Manuscript by Stephen Savage, Suva :  IPS, USP in association with the Ministry of Education of the Cook Islands, 1983.
 Kai Korero :  Cook Islands Maori Language Coursebook, Tai Carpentier and Clive Beaumont, Pasifika Press, 1995. (A useful learning Method with oral skills cassette)
 Cook Islands Cook Book by Taiora Matenga-Smith. Published by the Institute of Pacific Studies.
 Maori Lessons for the Cook Islands, by Taira Rere. Wellington, Islands Educational Division, Department of Education, 1960.
 Conversational Maori, Rarotongan Language, by Taira Rere. Rarotonga, Government Printer. 1961.
 Some Maori Lessons, by Taira Rere. Rarotonga. Curriculum Production Unit, Department of Education. 1976.
 More Maori Lessons, by Taira Rere. Suva, University of the South Pacific.1976
 Maori Spelling: Notes for Teachers, by Taira Rere. Rarotonga: Curriculum Production Unit, Education Department.1977.
 Traditions and Some Words of the Language of Danger or Pukapuka Island. Journal of the Polynesian Society 13:173-176.1904.
 Collection of Articles on Rarotonga Language,  by Jasper Buse. London: University of London, School of Oriental and African Studies. 1963.
 Manihikian Traditional Narratives: In English and Manihikian: Stories of the Cook Islands (Na fakahiti o Manihiki). Papatoetoe, New Zealand: Te Ropu Kahurangi.1988
 Te korero o Aitutaki, na te Are Korero o Aitutaki, Ministry of Cultural Development, Rarotonga, Cook Islands. 1992
 Atiu nui Maruarua :  E au tua taito, Vainerere Tangatapoto et al. University of South Pacific, Suva 1984. (in Maori and English)
 Learning Rarotonga Maori, by Makiuti Tongia, Ministry of Cultural Development, Rarotonga 1999.
 Te uri Reo Maori (translating in Maori), by Makiuti Tongia, Punanga o te reo. 1996.
 Atiu, e enua e tona iti tangata, te au tata tuatua Ngatupuna Kautai...(et al.), Suva, University of the South Pacific.1993. (Maori translation of Atiu :  an island Community)
 A vocabulary of the Mangaian language'' by Christian, F. W. 1924. Bernice P. Bishop Bulletin 2. Honolulu, Bernice P. Bishop Museum.
 E au tuatua taito no Manihiki, Kauraka Kauraka, IPS, USP, Suva. 1987.

External links 

 Cook Islands Maori Database
 Dictionary of Cook Islands Languages.
  Te akataka reo Rarotonga; or, Rarotongan and English grammar by the Rev Aaron Buzacott of the London Missionary Society, Rarotonga. 1854. Old grammar in english and Rarotongan
 "Tuatua mai!" Learn Cook Islands Maori
 Te Reo Maori Act 2003
 SBS Cook Islands Maori Radio Program. Updated each week
 Cook Islands Biodiversity : Natural History Māori Dictionaries 
 Cook Islands Maori Dictionary Online version of Jasper Buse and Raututi Taringa Dictionary
 Cook Islands Ministry of Cultural Development
 Te Reo Māori Kūki Āirani i roto i te Kurakarāma o Aotearoa (Cook Islands Maori in the New Zealand Curriculum)
 Collected songs and legends from the southern Cook Islands (c. 1883–1912) at the New Zealand Electronic Text Centre
 Box of 324 index cards of plant and animal names archived with Kaipuleohone
 Paradisec has an open access collection of Cook Island Maori materials
 Materials on Cook Islands Maori are included in the open access [Arthur Capell] collection (AC1) held by Paradisec.

Languages of New Zealand
Languages of the Cook Islands
Tahitic languages